Route 47 is a highway in eastern Missouri.  Its northern terminus is at Route 79 near Winfield; its southern terminus is at U.S. Route 67 in Bonne Terre.

Route description
The highway begins at Route 79 in Winfield, MO, where it travels due west towards Troy and Hawk Point, where it turns south and meets Interstate 70 in Warrenton.

After Warrenton, the highway continues south to Marthasville, where it intersects with Route 94. The two highways share a concurrency through the Missouri River bottomlands for approximately 4 miles to near Dutzow. The highway still continues south across the Missouri River into Washington, where it intersects Route 100.

From Washington, Route 47 goes down to Union, where it meets up with US Route 50. Route 47 runs concurrent with U.S. 50 very shortly before returning south towards St. Clair.

At St. Clair, Route 47 meets Interstate 44, before joining up with Route 30. The highway now runs east with that route for about 8 miles, until returning south. This stretch of highway is very rural, narrow, and windy. It joins up with Route 21 for a short concurrency, before heading east towards Bonne Terre at its terminus with U.S. Route 67.

History
Route 47 is one of the original 1922 state highways.  Its original northern terminus was at Troy, its southern terminus was at Villa Ridge.  The section between Washington and Villa Ridge becoming part of Route 100.

Major intersections

References

047
Transportation in St. Francois County, Missouri
Transportation in Washington County, Missouri
Transportation in Franklin County, Missouri
Transportation in Warren County, Missouri
Transportation in Lincoln County, Missouri